Mt. Whitney High School is a public high school in Visalia, California, United States, founded in 1952.

Academics

In 2009 Mount Whitney was declared a California Distinguished School.

Athletics
Mt. Whitney competes in the California Interscholastic Federation (CIF), Central Section Division II, East Yosemite League.

History
Mt. Whitney High School opened in 1952 as Visalia High School on Conyer Street, a few blocks away from the site of Visalia Union High School. The new Visalia High School was built to provide room for the rapid growth of the "Baby Boom" that followed WWII. The new site, Visalia High School, provided students in the Visalia Union High School District modern facilities and space for the playing field needed by the growing number of students.

Visalia High School was painted two shades of light blue/aqua, the same colors as the College of the Sequoias on Mooney Blvd. Both Visalia Union High School and Visalia Junior College, which would become College of the Sequoias, had been located on the old Visalia Union High school Campus on Main street.

The need for high school classrooms grew faster than was expected when the Visalia High School Campus was opened. In 1955 The old Visalia Union High school campus was reopened as a second high school and named Redwood High School. From 1952 to 1954, the old VUHS campus had served as a junior high school feeding into Visalia High School. Visalia High School was renamed Mt. Whitney High School at the same time.

Mt. Whitney High School retained VUHS's original school colors of maroon and white, the Oak as the yearbook, and their Pioneer mascot.

Notable alumni

Avi Kaplan
Cody Gibson
Kevin Costner
Tom Johnston (musician)

References

External links
Official site

High schools in Tulare County, California
Public high schools in California
Education in Visalia, California
1952 establishments in California